is a song recorded by Japanese idol group Nogizaka46. It was released on June 9, 2021, as the group's 27th single, through N46Div. The song was written by Yasushi Akimoto and composed by Katsuhiko Sugiyama and Apazzi. Sakura Endō served as the center position, and Sayuri Matsumura, Junna Itō, Miria Watanabe, and Momoko Ōzono participated as their last single from the group. The song charted atop the Oricon Singles Chart and Billboard Japan Hot 100.

Background and release

Nogizaka46 announced their 27th single on April 11, 2021, and the participating members (senbatsu) on April 18 in the group's television show Nogizaka Under Construction. The title "Gomen ne Fingers Crossed" was announced on May 3. The full song was unveiled on May 6 on Tokyo FM's radio show School of Lock! in the part of Nogizaka Lock!, in which the member Haruka Kaki is a regular cast. The song was performed for the first time on June 4 at the television show Buzz Rhythm 02.

The physical-format single set to be released on June 9, in 4 limited editions: Type-A, Type-B, Type-C, and Type-D, and regular edition. The limited editions also included all 43-members' individual PVs. The cover artworks of all physical releases were unveiled on May 10, taken by Kenta Karima in early April. They show the members freely enjoy themselves with oversized soap bubbles, confetti, feather, a lot of balloons and large-size colorful cellophanes. The special edition was released to digital music and streaming platform on June 2, 2021.

B-sides

The B-sides  sung by fourth generation members and  sung by third generation members was announced and performed for the first time on the encore part of their concert 9th Year Birthday Live on May 8 and 9, respectively. The under members (members who do not participate in the main song) song of the single was announced on May 10, titled  on the radio show Yamazaki Rena no Dareka ni Hanashitakatta Koto.

The other three tracks were unveiled on May 15: collaboration song with rhythm game Nogizaka Rhythm Festival, Yūki Yoda and Ayame Tsutsui's unit song, and Sayuri Matsumura solo song for graduation (leaving) from the group, . "Zenbu Yume no Mama" was unveiled and performed on May 21 in the live video of the game. The full song of "Zabun Zazabin" was aired in Nogizaka46 no "No" on May 23.

Lyrics and composition

"Gomen ne Fingers Crossed" was written lyrics by Yasushi Akimoto, and composed by Katsuhiko Sugiyama and Apazzi in the key of D major, 130 beats per minute with a running time of 4 minutes and 17 seconds. The song is about sadness when thinking about another person. Sakura Endō, who served as a center position of the song said "Gomen ne Fingers Crossed" is a good tempo and the overall mature tone is impressive. "Fingers crossed" means "good luck", so she thinks it's a sad but positive farewell song.

Commercial performance

On the Oricon charts, "Gomen ne Fingers Crossed" debuted at number 19 on the Oricon Digital Singles Chart for the chart issue date of June 14, 2021, with 5,046 download units. The special edition of the single debuted at number 1 on the Oricon Digital Albums Chart with 4,003 download units. The single debuted at number one on the Oricon Singles Chart for the chart issue date of June 21, 2021, selling 589,751 copies, recorded as the 26th single in a row since the group's 2nd single, "Oide Shampoo", and the female artist's best-selling single in 2021.

The song entered number 44 on the Billboard Japan Hot 100 for the chart issue date of June 9, 2021. In its second week dated June 16, the song jumped to number 1 due to physical release. The single debuted atop the Top Singles Sales, selling 704,346 copies.

On July 9, 2021, "Gomen ne Fingers Crossed" received a triple platinum certification from the Recording Industry Association of Japan (RIAJ), denoting shipments of 750,000 copies.

Music video

On May 11, 2021, the special website for the 27th single was launched. It was revealed the details about a story, characters, and relation diagram in the music video. The full music video was premiered due to the launch of the group's new YouTube channel Nogizaka Streaming Now and uploaded to the group's official YouTube channel on May 13.

The music video "Gomen ne Fingers Crossed" was directed by Atsunori Tōshi, who also was directed the group's song "Wilderness World", and shot at the big steel factory in Ibaraki Prefecture in mid-April. The music video uses an "auto racing" theme with a "3 to 3" match between team Lost and Found (Yūki Yoda, Sakura Endō, and Haruka Kaki) and team Rain Bringer (Erika Ikuta, Asuka Saitō, and Mizuki Yamashita), with the six powerful and fast racing cars. The background shows a diner secretly operating at a beach, where racers competing for speed gathered from all over Japan. Director said the music video was inspired by the movie Fast & Furious. The music video also shows a dance scene shot in the rain.

B-sides

The b-side music videos "Zabun Zazabun" from Type-B and "Sabita Compass" from Type-D were released simultaneously on May 25, 2021. The music video "Zabun Zazabun" was directed by Kazuki Takahashi, shot mainly at Yokosuka, Kanagawa Prefecture in mid-April. The story shows Yūki Yoda invites Ayame Tsutsui to go out with her to encourage Tsutsui, who is depressed because of her unrequited love. The music video also shows a dance scene at the beach, which was choreographed in the image of a wave, and a rowing boat scene in the sea to go offshore in the last scene. The music video "Sabita Compass" was directed by Takurō Ōkubo, shot in a road movie style for two days in mid-April at Izu, Shizuoka Prefecture. The story shows the members who go on a trip to keep a fun memory and visit various places in the city. Many of the photos were taken by members themselves, make a handmade feeling.

The music video "Zenbu Yume no Mama" was released on May 28. It was directed by Yuki Kamiya, shot at the hotel in Chiba Prefecture in early April. It is a story-style music video about Yūki Yoda, who got lost in a luxurious and classical Western mansion, explored with a guide while being tossed by the residents.

The music video "Sa~ Yu~ Ready?", Sayuri Matsumura's graduation song from Type-C was released on June 1. It was directed in mid to late April by 3 directors, Kentarō Hagiwara in the first part, Shigeru Tsukita in the second part, and Shūto Itō in the third part. The first part shows Matsumura practicing finger dance. The second part shows her cooking a karaage. The images and motifs from the interlude to the last reflected the intention and all the songs of herself.

Track listing

Credits adapted from the official website, Tower Records Japan and Tidal. All lyrics are written by Yasushi Akimoto, expect off vocal (instrumental) version tracks.

Limited edition

Regular edition

Special edition

Participating members

The 20 members were selected to be participating (senbatsu) members for "Gomen ne Fingers Crossed", and 12 members for fukujin (first and second-row members). Sakura Endō was selected as the center position for the second time since "Yoake Made Tsuyogaranakutemoii". Seira Hayakawa was selected to participate for the first time. Sayuri Matsumura, and Momoko Ōzono participate as their last single from the group.

Third row: Higuchi Hina, Hayakawa Seira, Ayame Tsutsui, Momoko Ōzono, Renka Iwamoto, Rei Seimiya, Mayu Tamura, Mai Shinuchi
Second row: Manatsu Akimoto, Minami Umezawa, Minami Hoshino, Sayuri Matsumura, Erika Ikuta, Shiori Kubo, Kazumi Takayama
First row: Yūki Yoda, Asuka Saitō, Sakura Endō , Mizuki Yamashita, Haruka Kaki

B-sides

"Zenbu Yume no Mama"
All participating members of "Boku wa Boku o Suki ni Naru", expect graduated member Miona Hori, participate in the song. Yūki Yoda served as the center position.

"Otonatachi ni wa Shiji Sarenai"
All 12 members from third generation members participate in the song. Renka Iwamoto served as the center position.

"Zabun Zazabun"
Yūki Yoda and Ayame Tsutsui participate in the song.

"Sa~ Yu~ Ready?"
Sayuri Matsumura participates in the song as her graduation solo song.

"Sabita Compass"
All 13 members who do not participate in the main song (under members) (not include fourth generation) participate in the song. Rena Yamazaki served as the center position for the first time. Junna Itō, and Miria Watanabe participate as their last single from the group.

"Nekojita Camomile Tea"

All 16 members from fourth generation members participate in the song. Mayu Tamura served as the center position for the first time.

Accolades

Charts

Weekly charts

Monthly charts

Year-end charts

Certifications

Release history

See also

 List of Oricon number-one singles of 2021
 List of Hot 100 number-one singles of 2021 (Japan)

References

External links
 27th single "Gomen ne Fingers Crossed" special website

Music videos
 
 
 
 
 

2021 singles
2021 songs
Billboard Japan Hot 100 number-one singles
Japanese-language songs
Nogizaka46 songs
Oricon Weekly number-one singles
Songs with lyrics by Yasushi Akimoto
Songs written by Katsuhiko Sugiyama
Sony Music Entertainment Japan singles